Coleophora biforis is a moth of the family Coleophoridae. It is found in the United States, including Ohio.

The larvae feed on the seeds of Echinata species. They create a trivalved, tubular silken case.

References

biforis
Moths described in 1921
Moths of North America